M. P. Sankunni Nair (1917-2006) is a Sanskrit scholar and critic from Kerala. He was born at Mezhathur near Pattambi in Palakkad District. He studied at the Sanskrit college in Pattambi.

He won Odakkuzhal Award in 1989 and Kendra Sahitya Akademi Award in 1991 for his work Chathravum Chamaravum. He received Kerala Sahitya Akademi Fellowship in 1994. His works such as `Natyamandapam' and `Chathravum Chamaravum' reflect his deep knowledge of dramaturgy and the Natya Shastra.

References 

People from Palakkad district
1917 births
2006 deaths
Recipients of the Sahitya Akademi Award in Malayalam
Recipients of the Kerala Sahitya Akademi Award
Indian male dramatists and playwrights
Malayalam-language writers
Dramatists and playwrights from Kerala
Malayalam literary critics